Shiwar Gram Panchayat constituency is one of the 23 Gram Panchayat constituencies in the block of Chauth ka Barwara in Sawai Madhopur.

References

Gram panchayats in India
Sawai Madhopur district